Yuriy Fedosenko (born 10 May 1989 in Ukraine) is a professional Ukrainian footballer midfielder playing in the professional Ukrainian First League club Desna Chernihiv. He moved from the Ukrainian First League club Helios Kharkiv during the 2008–09 summer transfer season.

Biography 
Yuriy Fedosenko was born in Kovel, Volyn region in 1989. Being a pupil of the Lutsk "Volyn"? he used to play for Dynamo (Kiev), Izotop (Kuznetsovsk) and Obriy (Nikopol).

He started his adult football career in Volyn Lutsk, but did not play a single official match for the first team. In 2007, he joined Helios Kharkiy, where he played 13 matches (1 goal) and 1 match in the Ukrainian Cup in the first league. He joined Desna Chernihiv in 2008. In 2009, Yuriy joined Phoenix-Ilyichevets. In the first league for the team with Kalinino, he played 11 matches (1 goal), spent 3 more matches in the Ukrainian Cup. During the next season (2009-2010), he also played 3 matches in the first league for Niva Ternopil. The following season he played in Poland, as a member of the third-league club Radomyak. Then he returned to Ukraine, went through a training camp with Volyn Lutsk, but the head coach Anatoly Demyanenko refused to take Yuriy with the first team. In 2013, he signed a contract with Sumy, but he played only 2 matches in the first league. At the end of season, he left Sumy.

From 2013 to 2014, he played for Odek. In the Ukrainian Amateur Championship, he played 6 matches. In 2014, he joined FC Malinsk, where he played until 2019.

See also 
Football in Ukraine

References 

1989 births
Living people
Ukrainian footballers
Association football midfielders
FC Helios Kharkiv players
FC Desna Chernihiv players